Moreno De Pauw (born 12 August 1991) is a Belgian former cyclist, who rode professionally for  between 2014 and 2019.

Major results

2013
 1st Stage 5 Rás Tailteann
2014
 2nd Six Days of Grenoble (with Otto Vergaerde)
2015
 1st Six Days of London (with Kenny De Ketele)
2016
 National Track Championships
1st  Points race 
1st  Madison race (with Kenny De Ketele)
2nd  Scratch Race
 1st Six Days of London (with Kenny De Ketele)
 1st Six Days of Amsterdam (with Kenny De Ketele)
 2nd Six Days of Ghent (with Kenny De Ketele)
 2nd Six Days of Copenhagen (with Kenny De Ketele)
 3rd  Madison (with Kenny De Ketele), UEC European Track Championships
 3rd  Madison, Glasgow (with Kenny De Ketele), UCI Track World Cup
2017
 1st  Omnium, National Track Championships
 1st Six Days of Ghent (with Kenny De Ketele)
 1st Six Days of Berlin (with Kenny De Ketele)
 1st Six Day Final Mallorca (with Kenny De Ketele)
 2nd Six Days of Copenhagen (with Kenny De Ketele)
 3rd  Madison (with Kenny De Ketele), UCI Track World Championships
 3rd Six Days of London (with Kenny De Ketele)
2018
 2nd Six Days of Berlin (with Kenny De Ketele)
 2nd Six Days of Copenhagen (with Yoeri Havik)

References

External links

1991 births
Living people
Belgian male cyclists
Sportspeople from Sint-Niklaas
Cyclists from East Flanders
Cyclists at the 2019 European Games
European Games competitors for Belgium